La Revancha (English title: The Revenge) is a telenovela produced by Venevisión and Fonovideo and filmed in Miami, Florida, in 2000. It is a remake of the 1989 telenovela of the same name written by Mariela Romero. The telenovela lasted for 151 episodes and was distributed internationally by Venevisión International.

Danna García and Jorge Reyes starred as the main protagonists while Marcela Pezet, Jorge Aravena and Jorge Martinez starred as antagonists.

Plot
Arístides Ruiz and Rodrigo Arciniegas were business partners, but when Arístides discovered his partner was dealing in illegal businesses behind his back, Rodrigo killed him before he could report him. The two daughters of Arístides, Isabella and the little Mariana, become separated after the nanny who witnesses the crime, runs off with little Mariana.

Years later, Mariana who is now called Soledad, has been raised up by her nanny who she believes to be her real mother. On the other hand, Isabella has grown up under the care of her god-father surrounded by luxuries and comforts, making her proud and selfish. But she still remembers the crime committed against her father and vows to find her sister and get revenge on Rodrigo Arciniegas.

However, fate will cause these two sisters to meet again, but in an unfavorable way since they will become enemies vying for the affections of the same man they fall in love with, Alejandro Arciniegas, the son of the man who killed their father.

Cast

Main Cast 
Danna García as Mariana Ruiz / Soledad Santander
Jorge Reyes as Alejandro Arciniegas
Marcela Pezet as Isabela Ruiz. Villain, later turns good, when she realized that Soledad is her sister. Wants to revenge on Rodrigo, because he killed their father, Aristides
Jorge Aravena as Reinaldo Arciniegas. Villain, accomplice in murders, tries to kill Jose Luis, tries to rap Soledad. Died in the end of the story by gunshots he took in place of the love of his life Mercedita
Jorge Martinez as Rodrigo Arciniegas. Main villain. Killed Aristides. Goes crazy. Sailors out to the sea and dies.
Elluz Peraza as Emperatriz vda. de Azcárraga. Villain, hates Isabella, but turns good in the end of the story.
Maritza Rodriguez as Mercedes Riverol
Henry Zakka as Oscar Riverol. Villain, later good. Arrested by the police from complicity in murders of Rodrigo.
Patricia Alvarez as Lola Cienfuegos
Alberto Mayagoitia as Leonardo Manrique
Vicente Tepedino as Jose Luis Hernandez

Secondary Cast 
Raquel Bustos as Rosarito
Juan Carlos Gutierez as Sabas
Norma Zúñiga as Providencia Santander
Ninel Conde as Reina Azcarraga. Villain.
Orlando Casin as Santiago
Claudia Reyes as Brenda. Villain, later good.
Yadira Santana as Bernarda Rondon
Diana Quijano as Lucia Arciniegas
Felix Manrique as Kike Arciniegas
Lino Martone as Gulliermo Arciniegas
Olimpia Maldonado as Lupe
Rosa Felipe as Doña Rosa
Martha Mijares as Romelia Hernández
Rosalinda Rodriguez-Tula
Omar Moynelo as Alvaro del Rosal
Tatiana Capote as Sandra Castillo
Yoli Dominguez as Fanny
Monica Rubio as Carolina Reyes
Andres Gutierrez as Carlos Alberto Mendez

References

External links 

2000 telenovelas
Venevisión telenovelas
Spanish-language American telenovelas
2000 American television series debuts
2000 American television series endings
Venezuelan telenovelas
Univision telenovelas
American telenovelas
Television shows set in Miami